is a 2007 Japanese film written, directed, edited by the film's lead star Takeshi Kitano. It is the second film in Kitano's surrealist autobiographical trilogy, following Takeshis', and concluding with Achilles and the Tortoise.

Style
The comedy crosses a broad range of genres common to Japanese film in a fashion similar to  Getting Any?, Kitano's 1995 parody. Kitano described the film as "a cinematic extension of his manzai comedy routines that continues in much the same vein as his last feature, the similarly eclectic Takeshis'''."

Plot
Kitano plays a hapless film director in search of a commercial hit, while suffering failure after failure as he tries out different genres.

 Cast 
Takeshi Kitano
Tōru Emori
Kayoko Kishimoto
Anne Suzuki
Keiko Matsuzaka
Yoshino Kimura
Kazuko Yoshiyuki
Yuki Uchida
Akira Takarada
Yumiko Fujita
Ren Osugi
Susumu Terajima
Naomasa Musaka

Reception
In 2007, the Venice Film Festival introduced a new award named after the film; Kitano was the first recipient of this Glory to the Filmmaker!'' award.

References

External links
 
 
 Movie trailer at Official site
Kantoku Banzai reviewed at Twitch 

2007 films
2007 comedy-drama films
Films directed by Takeshi Kitano
Japanese comedy-drama films
2000s Japanese-language films